Hygrotus decoratus  is a species of Dytiscidae native to Europe.

References

Hygrotus
Beetles described in 1810
Beetles of Europe